Disney's Stitch: Experiment 626 is a 2002 action-adventure video game developed by High Voltage Software and published by Sony Computer Entertainment for the PlayStation 2. The game serves as a prequel to the 2002 Disney film Lilo & Stitch. The game has Chris Sanders, David Ogden Stiers and Kevin Michael Richardson reprise their voice roles from the film. The game was released on June 19, 2002, two days before the theatrical release of the Lilo & Stitch film.

Gameplay 
Disney's Stitch: Experiment 626 is a basic platform game, with an environment for exploring, item finding, and fighting enemies. Plasma guns are the standard armaments. With his four arms, Stitch, known during the game's events as Experiment 626, can equip up to four at once, but only two when climbing or holding an object. There are two special weapons: a "Big Gun" that fires guided rockets that do massive damage and a Freeze Ray which coats enemies in ice. The game includes collectibles that the player must equip and find to progress throughout the game. Stitch is under the control of Jumba at the time of the game, and he orders Stitch to find DNA samples, which assist him in performing more experiments. Blue DNA count as one sample, while red DNA count as five samples. Squid bots allow the player to try and garner a "movie reel"; these 105 reels are used to buy various scenes from the film as well as previews. Stitch also can find gadgets to assist him in navigating the environment. Grapple guns are provided to allow Stitch to swing over hazardous substances or to reach difficult spots. A jet pack is also featured which can allow Stitch limited flight time.

The game has many enemies in Stitch's dangerous quest for DNA. These include United Galactic Federation soldiers, frogbots, heavy soldiers, Gantu's elite frogbots, mutant "greemas", and buzzers. Bosses include Dr. Habbitrale in his giant robot, Experiment 621 (after being mutated), and Gantu.

Plot 
The game is set before the events of Lilo & Stitch, with 626 being known as a galactic fugitive before he was put on trial.

The game begins with Jumba Jookiba showcasing his latest experiment: 626, who is proven to be superior compared to other experiments such as 621. Jumba assigned 626 to collect enough DNA from the world of the Greemas to create his 700 series of experiments. This caught the attention of the evil Dr. Habbitrale, a rival of Jumba who's been mutating Greemas. Dr. Habbitrale used a gigantic mech to squish 626 before he was sent out through the airlock inside a hamster ball.

Now that the 700 experiments are complete, 626 decides to get more DNA to power teleportation devices and get the United Galactic Federation soldiers out of Jumba's lab. As 626 felt that his quest for collecting DNA is complete, he and Jumba saw 621 putting himself and the DNA in the mutator to prove his superiority. As a result, it enlarged 621 with a deformed body. After 626 defeats 621, Captain Gantu arrives and arrests the three.

Inside the prison, 626 was hired by Jumba to rescue his creator and get inside Captain Gantu's ship. Inside the shaft of the ship, he encountered Gantu and defeated him.

Characters 

Stitch (then named Experiment 626) serves as the main protagonist and playable character of the video game.

The game is notable for introducing another experiment: 621, who is jealous over 626 being the superior experiment. The character's name that either Lilo or another character would later give him (Chopsuey) was later revealed in Leroy & Stitch (2006). However, this game remains the character's only physical appearance in the Lilo & Stitch franchise.

Voice cast 
 Chris Sanders as Experiment 626 / Stitch
 David Ogden Stiers as Jumba Jookiba
 Kevin Michael Richardson as Captain Gantu
 James Arnold Taylor as Dr. Habbitrale
 Frank Welker as Experiment 621 and Mutant Greema
 Jennifer Hale as Additional Voices

Zoe Caldwell is also credited in the game as a voice talent, but her role as the Grand Councilwoman was not featured in the final game.

Reception 

The game was met with mixed reception upon release; GameRankings gave it an aggregated review score of 63.59%, while Metacritic gave it 59 out of 100.

References

External links 

 
 

2002 video games
Disney video games
High Voltage Software games
Lilo & Stitch (franchise) video games
Platform games
PlayStation 2 games
PlayStation 2-only games
Single-player video games
Sony Interactive Entertainment games
3D platform games
Video game prequels
Video games about genetic engineering
Video games developed in the United States
Video games set on fictional planets